Scarlet Carmina are a British rock band from Worcester, England.

Their song "Badass Romantic" is featured over the 25th anniversary DVD release of 1980s cult classic This is Spinal Tap.

The band has been championed heavily by The Friday Session Introducing on BBC Hereford & Worcester.

References

External links
Official website

English rock music groups